This is a list of members of the Western Australian Legislative Council elected to serve a term between 22 May 2017 and 21 May 2021.

 East Metropolitan One Nation MLC Charles Smith resigned from the party on 11 June 2019.

Members of Western Australian parliaments by term
Members of the Western Australian Legislative Council